John Denvir may refer to:

 John Denvir (American football), American football guard
 John Denvir (soldier), New Zealand Army officer
 John T. Denvir, American politician in Illinois and writer about checkers

See also
 John Denver, American singer-songwriter